Norcross is a city in Gwinnett County, Georgia, United States. The population as of the 2010 census was 9,116, while in 2020 the population was 17,209. It is included in the Atlanta-Sandy Springs-Marietta metropolitan statistical area.

History

Norcross was chartered as a town on October 26, 1870. The community was named for Jonathan Norcross, a former Atlanta Mayor and railroad official.

Geography

Norcross is located in western Gwinnett County at  (33.9386, -84.2086). It is bordered to the north by the city of Peachtree Corners. Interstate 85 forms the southern boundary of the city, with access from Exits 99 (Jimmy Carter Boulevard), 101 (Indian Trail Lilburn Road), and 102 (Georgia State Route 378).

Transportation

Major roads

  U.S. Route 23
  Interstate 85
  State Route 140
  State Route 141
  Interstate 285 (about 1.5 miles from city line)
  State Route 378

Transit systems
 Gwinnett County Transit serve the city.
 Norcross Greyhound Bus Terminal,  2105 Norcross Pkwy, Norcross, GA 30071

Pedestrians and cycling 
The Western Gwinnett Bikeway, is a multi-use trail along the Peachtree Industrial Boulevard. It is a shared use path, cycle track, and bike lane that connects Norcross to neighboring Duluth.

In September 2015, the Norcross City Council approved plans to do a concept study on developing the Beaver Ruin Creek Greenway. The greenway could serve to connect Norcross residents to the Peachtree Creek Greenway that is being developed in Atlanta, Brookhaven, Chamblee and Doraville.

Demographics

2020 census

As of the 2020 United States census, there were 17,209 people, 5,087 households, and 3,674 families residing in the city.

2010 census
As of 2010, Norcross had a population of 9,116.  The racial and ethnic composition of the population was 40.8% white, 19.8% black or African American, 0.7% Native American, 2.1% Asian Indian, 10.7% Asian, 0.1% Pacific Islander, 21.5% from some other race and 4.3% reporting two or more races.  39.4% of the population was Hispanic or Latino.

2000 census
At the 2000 census, there were 8,410 people, 2,644 households and 1,768 families residing in the city. The racial makeup of the city was 53.50% White, 20.82% African American, 0.54% Native American, 6.10% Asian, 0.04% Pacific Islander, 15.39% from other races, and 3.63% from two or more races. Hispanic or Latino of any race were 40.93% of the population.

There were 2,644 households, of which 33.6% had children under the age of 18 living with them, 45.3% were married couples living together, 13.2% had a female householder with no husband present, and 33.1% were non-families. 22.2% of all households were made up of individuals, and 4.7% had someone living alone who was 65 years of age or older. The average household size was 3.04 and the average family size was 3.35.

Age distribution was 22.7% under the age of 18, 14.8% from 18 to 24, 40.9% from 25 to 44, 15.5% from 45 to 64, and 6.1% who were 65 years of age or older. The median age was 30 years. For every 100 females, there were 130.7 males. For every 100 females age 18 and over, there were 134.8 males.

The median household income was $44,728 and the median family income was $42,893. Males had a median income of $26,485 versus $27,347 for females. The per capita income for the city was $18,573. About 11.8% of families and 17.9% of the population were below the poverty line, including 20.0% of those under age 18 and 17.2% of those age 65 or over.

Notable people
 Jake Camarda, NFL punter for the Tampa Bay Buccaneers
 Alvin Kamara, NFL running back for the New Orleans Saints
 Chris Herndon, NFL tight end for the New Orleans Saints
 Jason Croom, NFL tight end
 Davis Mills, NFL quarterback for the Houston Texans

Education

Primary and secondary schools 
Gwinnett County Public Schools serves Norcross. Each school's respective cluster is listed following its name.

Elementary schools
 Susan O. Stripling Elementary School (Norcross)
 Beaver Ridge Elementary School (Norcross)
 Meadowcreek Elementary School (Meadowcreek)
 Nesbit Elementary School (Meadowcreek)
 Norcross Elementary School (Norcross)
 Rockbridge Elementary School (Meadowcreek)
 Baldwin Elementary School (Norcross)

Middle schools
 Pinckneyville Middle School (Norcross)
 Summerour Middle School (Norcross)

High schools
 Meadowcreek High School (Meadowcreek)
 Norcross High School (Norcross)
 Paul Duke STEM High School (Alternative school for Norcross)
 McClure Health Science High School (Alternative school for Meadowcreek)

Other
 Brenau University Atlanta Campus (Private College)
 Greater Atlanta Christian School (Private School)
 GIVE Center West (Alternative School)
 Ashworth College (Online/Correspondence University)

Public libraries
Gwinnett County Public Library operates the Norcross Branch in Norcross.

Local companies 

RentPath, a large apartment guide company
Institute of Industrial Engineers, a professional society for industrial engineers
LSI Corporation, which designs semiconductors and software that accelerate storage and networking in datacenters and mobile networks
EMS Technologies, specializing in wireless communications
Waffle House, headquartered in Norcross
NanoLumens, designer and manufacturer of digital LED displays

Media
The main newspaper of Greater Atlanta is the Atlanta Journal-Constitution.

The Spanish language newspaper El Nuevo Georgia has its headquarters in unincorporated Gwinnett County near Norcross.

Filming
The ABC Studios television show Resurrection was filmed in the town square and all around Norcross.

The 2018 film Love, Simon has a carnival themed scene filmed in the Norcross town square.

All Elite Wrestling conducted their television tapings at The Nightmare Factory training facility operated by one of their coach/wrestlers, Q. T. Marshall, in Norcross in March 2020 during the COVID-19 epidemic.

References

External links

 City of Norcross official website

Cities in Georgia (U.S. state)
Cities in Gwinnett County, Georgia
Cities in the Atlanta metropolitan area
Populated places established in 1870
1870 establishments in Georgia (U.S. state)